The New Meanies, originally called the Blue Meanies, are a Canadian four piece rock band from Winnipeg.

History
Formed around 1990 by high school friends Damon Mitchell (lead vocals, guitar, harmonica), Jeff Hondubura (guitar, vocals), Sky Onosson (bass, vocals, keyboards) and Jason Kane (drums, percussion) started playing blues-influenced rock.

After releasing two independent albums, Experience is Lost (independently released on cassette only) and The Blue Meanies, they toured extensively throughout Western Canada in the early 1990s.  In 1996 the band signed with Virgin Records.  The band changed its name to the New Meanies due to the existence of another Blue Meanies based in Chicago, and recorded a new album Three Seeds in the Los Angeles area with producer Howard Benson.  The album was released in 1998, and the single "Letting Time Pass" achieved major airplay on radio and television, charting at No. 14 on RPM Magazine's Canadian rock/alternative chart. In 1999 the band performed in Toronto with Danko Jones and Tricky Woo. In 2000, the band went indie again and released a new album, Highways, in 2001.

Discography

Albums

Experience is Lost (1993)
The Blue Meanies (1995)
Three Seeds (1998)
Highways (2001)

Current status
The New Meanies are currently only performing sporadically.

References

External links

Musical groups with year of establishment missing
Musical groups from Winnipeg
Canadian indie rock groups
Musical groups established in 1990
1990 establishments in Manitoba